Austroglossus is a genus of soles native to the Atlantic coast of southern Africa.

Species
There are currently two recognized species in this genus:
 Austroglossus microlepis (Bleeker, 1863) (West coast sole)
 Austroglossus pectoralis (Kaup, 1858) (Mud sole)

References

Soleidae
Marine fish genera
Taxa named by Charles Tate Regan